Stefan Helmreich is a professor of cultural anthropology at the Massachusetts Institute of Technology. He graduated from Stanford University in 1995 with a Ph.D. in anthropology. He is also the author (and co-author) of Silicon Second Nature, Alien Ocean, and Sounding the Limits of Life. He specializes in the anthropology of scientists - specifically oceanographers. He won the Guggenheim Fellowship for Social Sciences, US & Canada in 2018. Helmreich was also a Radcliffe Fellow starting in 2018. He is married to Heather Paxson a cultural anthropologist of food and family

References 

Year of birth missing (living people)
Living people
MIT School of Humanities, Arts, and Social Sciences faculty
Stanford University alumni

American anthropologists